Lakewood Boulevard station is a below-grade light rail station on the C Line of the Los Angeles Metro Rail system. It is located in the median of Interstate 105 (Century Freeway), below Lakewood Boulevard, after which the station is named in the city of Downey, California.

The original name for the station was Lakewood Blvd/I-105, but was later changed to Lakewood Boulevard.

Service

Station layout

Hours and frequency

Connections 
, the following connections are available:
 DowneyLINK: Southeast
 Long Beach Transit: 22

References

C Line (Los Angeles Metro) stations
Railway stations in the United States opened in 1995
Downey, California
1995 establishments in California